George Young (19 April 1885 – 2 June 1952) was a British track and field athlete.  He competed at the 1908 Summer Olympics in London. In the 400 metres, Young won his preliminary heat with a time of 52.4 seconds.  He advanced to the semifinals, where he finished fourth in his four-man heat and did not advance to the final.

References

Sources

External links
 

1885 births
1952 deaths
Athletes (track and field) at the 1908 Summer Olympics
Olympic athletes of Great Britain
British male sprinters
Scottish male sprinters